The DRG Class 24 steam engines were German standard locomotives (Einheitslokomotiven) built for the Deutsche Reichsbahn between 1928 and 1939 to haul passenger trains.

History
These engines, nickname the 'prairie horse' (Steppenpferd) were developed specially for the long, flat routes in West and East Prussia. 95 examples were built by the firms of Schichau, Linke-Hofmann and others. The two units with operating numbers 24 069 and 24 070 were supplied by Borsig with a medium pressure boiler.

The Deutsche Bundesbahn took over 38 locomotives and retired them by 1966. The last one with the DB was locomotive number 24 067, which was stabled in Rheydt and taken out of service there in August 1966. The engines were given operating numbers 24 001 to 24 095.

Engine numbers 24 002, 004, 009, 021 and 030 were left with the DR after the Second World War. They were all stabled in Jerichow shed in 1960 and their sphere of operations until 1968 was the branch line network of the Kleinbahn AG in Genthin. No. 24 009 was re-numbered in 1970 to 37 1009 and was used as a reserve breakdown engine in Güsten and Stendal. In 1972 it was sold to the West German railway magazine Eisenbahn-Kurier. 

Thirty-four locomotive remained in Poland after the Second World War, where PKP classified them as Oi2. They served until the last one was withdrawn in 1976. One of the preserved locomotives in Germany, no. 24 083, had been in service in Poland.

The locomotives were equipped with 3 T 16 and 3 T 17 tenders.

Four Class 24 locomotives have been preserved: three in Germany (24 004, 24 009 and 24 083), and one in Poland (Oi2-29).

See also
 List of DRG locomotives and railbuses

Literature
 Klaus-Detlev Holzborn (2015): Der Sonderling 24 061. In: Eisenbahn-Magazin. Nr. 7, ISSN 0342-1902, S. 14.
 
 

24
2-6-0 locomotives
24
Henschel locomotives
Krupp locomotives
Railway locomotives introduced in 1928
Borsig locomotives
Passenger locomotives
Standard gauge locomotives of Germany
1′C h2 locomotives
Schichau-Werke locomotives